Río Jiménez is a district of the Guácimo canton, in the Limón province of Costa Rica.

History 
Río Jiménez was created on 26 June 1971 by Decreto 1769-G.

Geography 
Río Jiménez has an area of  km² and an elevation of  metres.

Locations
 Villages (Poblados): Ángeles, Bocas del Río Silencio, Camarón, Cartagena, Dulce Nombre, Escocia, Irlanda, Ligia, Santa María, Socorro

Demographics 

For the 2011 census, Río Jiménez had a population of  inhabitants.

Transportation

Road transportation 
The district is covered by the following road routes:
 National Route 248
 National Route 811

References 

Districts of Limón Province
Populated places in Limón Province